UGA or Uga may refer to:

People
 Elisa Uga, an Italian fencer

Characters
 Uga (mascot), the live English Bulldog mascot of University of Georgia athletics

Places
 Uga (Lanzarote), a village in Yaiza municipality in the province of Las Palmas, Lanzarote
 Uga, Nigeria, a town in Anambra, Nigeria
 Uqah or Uga, a village in Azerbaijan
 IATA airport code for Bulgan Airport, Bulgan Province, Mongolia

Organizations, groups, companies
 United Game Artists, a second-party developer of computer and video games  for SEGA
 United Golf Association was a group of African-American professional golfers who operated a separate series of professional golf tournaments for Blacks during the era of racial segregation
 Air Uganda (ICAO airline code: UGA; IATA airline code: U7)

Universities
 University of Georgia, a public research university located in Athens, Georgia, USA.
 Université Grenoble Alpes, a French public research university located in Grenoble, France

Computing
 User Global Area, part of the System Global Area in Oracle database software
 UXGA or UGA, Ultra Graphics Array

Science
 UGA ("opal" or "umber"), a stop codon within genetic code
 Uga (genus), a genus in subfamily Haltichellinae
 Universal geometric algebra

See also

 Ugas, characters in the Conker series
 Ooga, a game developed by Bolt Creative